Carebara incerta is a species of ant in the family Formicidae. It was described by Felix Santschi in 1923.

References 

Myrmicinae
Insects described in 1923